A statue of Francisco Tenamaztle is installed in Centro, Guadalajara's Plaza Fundadores, in the Mexican state of Jalisco.

References

External links

 

Centro, Guadalajara
Monuments and memorials in Jalisco
Outdoor sculptures in Guadalajara
Sculptures of men in Mexico
Statues in Jalisco